The 1923 Columbia Lions football team was an American football team that represented Columbia University as an independent during the 1923 college football season. The team played its home games at Baker Field in Upper Manhattan.

Schedule

References

Columbia
Columbia Lions football seasons
Columbia Lions football